Alkalibacter saccharofermentans  is a Gram-positive, obligately anaerobic, alkaliphilic and non-spore-forming bacterium from the genus of Alkalibacter which has been isolated from a soda lake in the Transbaikal regio in Russia.

References

External links
Type strain of Alkalibacter saccharofermentans at BacDive -  the Bacterial Diversity Metadatabase	

Lactobacillales
Bacteria described in 2005
Alkaliphiles